Kun Zhou from the Zhejiang University, Hangzhou, China was named Fellow of the Institute of Electrical and Electronics Engineers (IEEE) in 2015 for contributions to shape modeling and GPU computing.

References

Fellow Members of the IEEE
Academic staff of Zhejiang University
Living people
Chinese engineers
Year of birth missing (living people)
Place of birth missing (living people)